Pursue the Pennant is a video game published in 1986 for IBM PC compatibles. It is based on the long-running Pursue the Pennant board game.

Gameplay
Pursue the Pennant is a game in which play-by-play information comes from the current season when the game was produced.

Reception
Rick Teverbaugh reviewed the game for Computer Gaming World, and stated that "If the creators can figure out a way to produce old-time teams, let the fans create their own teams and put in a computer manager, PTP will be as good a package as anything on the market. Until then, it is a good choice, given the limitations."

Duane E. Widner reviewed the game for Computer Gaming World, and stated that "The games are fast, accurate, and demand both baseball knowledge and good player instincts. This is the only game to provide for up-to-date computer league stats and real-life performance during the game."

Reviews
PC Gamer Vol. 1 No. 3 (1994 August)

References

External links
Review in Game Players PC Entertainment
Article in Electronic Entertainment
Article in Computer Gaming World

1986 video games
Baseball video games
DOS games
DOS-only games
Video games based on board games
Video games developed in the United States